James F. McDowell was a member of the Wisconsin State Assembly.

Biography
McDowell was born on May 27, 1862. He attended what are now the University of Wisconsin–Oshkosh and Valparaiso University. In 1914, he settled in Montello, Wisconsin. He died on December 19, 1938, in Milwaukee, Wisconsin.

Career
McDowell was a member of the Assembly during the 1919 and 1921 sessions. Additionally, he was Superintendent of Schools of Marquette County, Wisconsin from 1895 to 1901 and Deputy Clerk of the Circuit Court of Marquette County from 1915 to 1919. He was a Republican.

References

1862 births
1938 deaths
People from Montello, Wisconsin
Republican Party members of the Wisconsin State Assembly
School superintendents in Wisconsin
Valparaiso University alumni
University of Wisconsin–Oshkosh alumni